Volodymyr Polyovyi (born 28 July 1985 in Zaporizhzhia, Ukrainian SSR, Soviet Union) is a Ukrainian football player (defender) who plays for Metalurh Zaporizhzhia .

External links
Statistics at FFU website

1985 births
Living people
FC Dynamo-3 Kyiv players
FC Metalurh Zaporizhzhia players
FC Metalurh-2 Zaporizhzhia players
FC Arsenal Kyiv players
Ukrainian footballers
Ukraine international footballers
Ukraine under-21 international footballers
Ukrainian Premier League players
Association football defenders
FC Metalurh Donetsk players
FC Dnipro players
FC Volyn Lutsk players
SC Dnipro-1 players
Footballers from Zaporizhzhia